The Pont de Pierre (French), meaning "Stone Bridge", is a Roman bridge in the Italian city of Aosta in the Aosta Valley.

The arch vault consists of large voussoirs and shows a comparatively flat profile (span to rise ratio 3:1). The facing was built of pudding stone, the spandrels filled with Roman concrete.

The structure is dated to the second half of the reign of Augustus (30 BC–14 AD), who had earlier founded the military colony Augusta Praetoria at an important road junction (24 BC). The Pont de Pierre was of particularly strategic importance, since in Aosta the transalpine routes to Gaul branched off into the Little St Bernard and the Great St Bernard Pass. In southeasterly direction towards the Po Valley, the road led over another segmental arch bridge, the excellently preserved Pont-Saint-Martin Bridge, located at the exit of the Aosta valley.

See also 
 Roman bridge
 List of Roman bridges
 Pont d'Aël

References

Sources

External links 

 
 Traianus – Technical investigation of Roman public works

Roman bridges in Italy
Roman segmental arch bridges
Deck arch bridges
Stone bridges in Italy
Bridges in Aosta Valley
Buildings and structures in Aosta